Adrian Hall (born 29 August 1943 in Cornwall) is a conceptual and performance artist who is also known for his activism for animal rights and climate change, teaching and writings.

Early life

Hall was born on 29 August 1943 in Cornwall, England. He attended the Royal College of Art in London between 1964 and 1967, while working as an artist assistant to Yoko Ono, featuring in a number of her performances, including Film No 4 [Bottoms] (1966). While at the Royal College, he studied philosophy with Iris Murdoch. In 1968 he moved to the US to do a Masters in Fine Art at the Yale School of Art and Architecture, while studying he fabricated work for Naum Gabo.

Career
After his studies at Yale, Adrian went on to teach at UCLA School of the Arts and Architecture. Following his time in the USA, Adrian has taught at art schools and exhibited globally; living in Northern Ireland, New Zealand, Australia and the United Kingdom. During the 1970s, Adrian exhibited regularly with the David Hendriks Gallery in Dublin. He was awarded the P.J. Carrolls Prize for Sculpture at the Irish Exhibition of Living Art in 1975. During his time in Australia, he was the head of sculpture at Sydney College of the Arts (SCA), from 1979 to 1984. Adrian was responsible for the establishment of the post-graduate programme of the School of Media Art at COFA where Adrian was head in the early 1990s. He has been the adjunct artist at Dunedin School of Art since 2011.

Personal life
Adrian currently resides in New Zealand.

References

External links 

 

1943 births
Living people
British contemporary artists
British conceptual artists
British performance artists
Art Students League of New York alumni
Yale School of Art alumni
Political artists